S M Matiur Rahman OSP, SUP, afwc, psc, is a three-star-rank Bangladesh Army officer, a lieutenant general and currently he is posted at Ministry of Foreign Affairs. He was General Officer Commanding, Army Training and Doctrine Command (GOC ARTDOC), Mymensingh Cantonment. Prior to join ARTDOC, he was GOC of 24 Infantry Division & Area Commander of Chattogram area. Earlier, he was Adjutant General of Bangladesh Army.  He was also vice chairman of Trust Bank's board of directors. He served as general officer commanding (GOC) of 55 Infantry Division & Area Commander of Jessore Area. He also served as the director of Counter-Terrorism Intelligence Bureau (CTIB) of Directorate General of Forces Intelligence. He served as Commander of 46th Independent Infantry Brigade. He also served as Additional Director General (Operations) of Rapid Action Battalion.

Education and training 
General Matiur completed his schooling from Kashbamajail Atahar Hossain High School & Higher School from Notre Dame College. He joined 13th BMA long course and was commissioned in the Corps of Infantry in December 1985. He attended various professional training courses at home and abroad. General Matiur in his early career attended Air Borne Course at Fort Benning, Georgia, in the United States. He is one of the pioneer officers of the Bangladesh Army to complete Jump Master Course and Free Fall Course from the School of Infantry and Tactics. He also completed the Jungle Operation Course from Malaysia.

General Matiur graduated from Defence Services Command and Staff College and from National Defence College. At the same time, he completed his Master's in Defence Studies (MDS) and Master's in War Studies (MWS) in 2000 and 2007 respectively from National University of Bangladesh.

Career 
In his career the General adorned various command and staff appointments at Battalion, Brigade and Division level. Besides, he served as an instructor in Bangladesh Military Academy and in the School of Infantry and Tactics for many years and thus contributed significantly in making and grooming the future leaders of Bangladesh Army.

UN Mission 
While he was a Major participated in United Nations Peacekeeping Mission in former Yugoslavia as a Military Observer in 1995–1996. He led a Bangladeshi Military Contingent in Ivory Coast as part of United Nations Peace Keeping Operation there in 2008–2009.

RAB 
Being a Colonel he held the appointment of Additional Director General (Operations) of Rapid Action Battalion Forces. Under his command for the first time law enforcers in Bangladesh have captured suspected members of Jaish-e-Mohammed, one of the major terrorist outfits operative in South Asia.

Army 
As lieutenant colonel, he commanded an infantry battalion and also the only para-commando battalion of Bangladesh Army. When he was promoted to brigadier general, he commanded the infantry brigade of Bangladesh Army – 46 Independent Infantry Brigade located at Dhaka.

He also served as GOC of 55 Infantry Division. He organized Assault River Crossing 2016, where the army for the first time used a drone to locate enemy position.

He joined the army headquarters as adjutant general on 9 February 2016. As Adjutant General of Bangladesh Army, he is the chairman of Army Housing Scheme, Governing Body of Cadet Colleges, Trust Transport Services and Trust Technical Training Institute. He is also the chairman of management committee of Sena Kalyan Sangstha and the vice chairman of Army Welfare Trust and Sena Hotel Developments Limited. He is the current president of Army Golf Club (AGC), Dhaka Cantonment.

CTIB 
As brigadier general he served as director of Counter Terrorism Intelligence Bureau (CTIB), a child agency of Directorate General of Forces Intelligence (DGFI).

ARTDOC 
In December 2020, Matiur Rahman was serving as a Major General and GOC of 24th Infantry Division in Chattogram when he was promoted to Lieutenant General and appointed to succeed Lieutenant General Shafiuddin Ahmed as the GOC of Army Training and Doctrine Command (ARTDOC) when Shafiuddin Ahmed was appointed as the Quartermaster General of the Bangladesh Army.

Personal life 
General Matiur is married to Syeda Towhida Aziz and is a father of two children.

References 

Living people
Bangladesh Army generals
Bangladeshi military personnel
1965 births